The Welsh Local Government Association (WLGA) represents the interests of local authorities in Wales. It is an affiliated member of the Local Government Association of England and Wales and the regional employers organisation.

The Welsh Local Government Association was established in 1996 to represent the interests of local government in Wales.  Since 1999 the WLGA has had a specific role in representing local government to the Welsh Government and the Senedd (Welsh Parliament).

Its members are the twenty-two local authorities in Wales.  The four police authorities, three fire and rescue authorities, and three national park authorities in Wales are associate members.

The WLGA considers that its primary purposes are to promote better local government and the reputation of local government, and to support local authorities in the development of policies and priorities which will improve public services and democracy. 
Town and community councils are outside the WLGA's ambit.  They are represented by One Voice Wales

Autism spectrum awareness program
Tesco, a multinational supermarket chain, has implemented training for its employees to meet the needs of its customers who are on the autism spectrum, which is estimated to be one of every 100 people in the United Kingdom. Employees use an online training site and respond to a questionnaire to assess the extent to which they became more aware of autism spectrum disorders (ASD). Tesco is the first company to participate in an awareness program led by the Welsh Local Government Association (WLGA). The online training and questionnaire tool is intended to be used by many organizations in Wales to identify and commend businesses that are "ASD Aware".

Notes and references

External links
  The Welsh Local Government Association (Cymdeithas Llywodraeth Leol Cymru)

Local government in Wales
1996 establishments in Wales
Government agencies established in 1996
Local government organizations
Organisations based in Cardiff
Council of European Municipalities and Regions
Regional employers organisations